The Girl from the Provinces (German:Das Mädel aus der Provinz) is a 1929 German silent film directed by James Bauer.

The art direction was by Robert A. Dietrich.

Cast
In alphabetical order
 Fred Doederlein as Bert  
 Anita Dorris as Steffi von der Heydt / Marikke Klotz  
 Maria Forescu as Zimmervermieterin  
 Alfred Gerasch as Dr. Harras  
 Hermine Sterler as Magda Ronacher

References

External links

1929 films
Films of the Weimar Republic
Films directed by James Bauer
German silent feature films
German black-and-white films